The Social Democratic Group (abbreviated S) is the second largest parliamentary group in the Swiss Federal Assembly. It is formed by the Social Democratic Party of Switzerland.

The Social Democratic Party were represented in the National Council; they sat as part of the Social-Political group with the democrats from 1896 then formed their own parliamentary group in 1911.

Composition

List of presidents of the group 
The group is currently presided by national councillor Roger Nordmann (VD)

 Herman Greulich (1911)
 Hans Affolter (1917)
 Ernest-Paul Graber (1918)
 Arthur Schmid sr. (1925)
 Robert Grimm (1936)
 Walther Bringolf (1945)
 Fritz Grütter (1953)
 Mathias Eggenberger (1957)
 Pierre Graber (1966)
 Edmund Wyss (1969)
 Anton Muheim (1971)
 Richard Müller (1972)
 Heinz Bratschi (1978)
 René Felber (1980)
 Félicien Morel (1981)
 Dario Robbianni (1983)
 Ursula Mauch (1987)
 Ursula Hafner (1995)
 Franco Cavalli (1999)
 Hildegard Fässler (2002)
 Ursula Wyss (2006)
 Andy Tschümperlin (2012)
 Roger Nordmann (2015)

References 

Social Democratic Party of Switzerland
Parliamentary groups in Switzerland